King Leka may refer to:

 Leka, Crown Prince of Albania (born 1939) (1939–2011), also known as King Leka I, son of Zog I of Albania; father of Leka II
 Leka, Crown Prince of Albania (born 1982), also known as King Leka II, grandson of Zog I of Albania, son of Leka I

See also
 Leka (disambiguation)